Aurel Moise (born 1 November 1956) is a Romanian former football goalkeeper.

Honours
Politehnica Timișoara
Divizia B: 1983–84, 1986–87, 1988–89(

Notes

References

1956 births
Living people
Romanian footballers
Association football goalkeepers
Liga I players
Liga II players
CS Minerul Lupeni players
CSM Jiul Petroșani players
FC Politehnica Timișoara players
FC CFR Timișoara players
Footballers from Bucharest